Georgios Diamantakos (alternate spellings: Giorgos, George) (born January 14, 1995) is a Greek professional basketball player for Mykonos of the Greek 3rd division. He is a right-handed 7 ft. 1 in. (2.16 m) tall center.

Professional career
Diamantakos began his pro career in Greece in 2012, when he played in the Greek League with Panathinaikos, in a game against Peristeri.

In July 2015, he signed with the Turkish club Darüşşafaka, of the Turkish Super League, and was subsequently loaned by them to the Greek club Nea Kifissia. Later, he played in a game with the Bulgarian club, Spartak Pleven, in November 2015. He was then loaned to the Croatian club GKK Šibenik, of the Croatian A-1 League.

In July 2016, he signed with Apollon Patras in Greece. 

On August 10, 2017, he joined G.S. Faros Larissas of the Greek Basket League. In summer 2018, Diamantakos followed the team's relocation to the island of Lemnos, under the name Ifaistos Limnou. On July 22, 2019, he renewed his contract with Ifaistos through 2021.

During the 2020-2021 season with Apollon Patras, Diamantakos averaged a career-high of 12.3 points, 8.2 rebounds, and 1.4 blocks per contest, in 16 games total. The club won the Greek 2nd division title and got promoted to the Greek Basket League. During the 2021-22 campaign, in 16 games, he averaged 5 points, 2.9 rebounds and 0.4 blocks, playing around 12 minutes per contest.

In August 2022, Diamantakos signed with ambitious 3rd division club AO Mykonou, in a rather surprising move.

National team career
Diamantakos was a member of the junior national teams of Greece. With Greece's junior national teams, he played at the 2011 FIBA Europe Under-16 Championship, the 2013 FIBA Europe Under-18 Championship, and the 2014 FIBA Europe Under-20 Championship.

Awards and honors

Club career
2× Greek League Champion: (2013, 2014)
3× Greek Cup Winner: (2013, 2014, 2015)
1x Greek A2 Basket League Champion: (2021)

References

External links
Euroleague.net Profile
FIBA Profile
FIBA Europe Profile
Eurobasket.com Profile
Greek Basket League Profile 
ASK4Sports.com Profile
NBADraft.net Profile

1995 births
Living people
Apollon Patras B.C. players
Greek expatriate basketball people in Turkey
Centers (basketball)
Darüşşafaka Basketbol players
GKK Šibenik players
Greek men's basketball players
Gymnastikos S. Larissas B.C. players
Ifaistos Limnou B.C. players
Nea Kifissia B.C. players
Panathinaikos B.C. players
People from Laconia